Anthony Procter (28 May 1943 – 21 March 2020) was a South African cricketer. He played in four first-class matches for Natal in the 1966/67 season.

He was the brother of Mike Procter.

References

External links
 

1943 births
2020 deaths
South African cricketers
KwaZulu-Natal cricketers
Place of birth missing